William Howard Brett (December 31, 1893 – April 10, 1989) was Director of the United States Mint from 1954 to 1961.

Biography

William H. Brett, the son of William Howard Brett, was a native of Cleveland.  He served in the United States Army during World War I and was educated at Dartmouth College.  After college, he returned to Ohio and went into business.

In 1954, President of the United States Dwight D. Eisenhower nominated Brett to be Director of the United States Mint, and Brett held this post from July 1954 to January 1961.  He was a contestant on What's My Line? on November 25, 1956.
Brett was also a contestant on the game show "To Tell The Truth" dated August 13, 1957.
After retiring from the Mint, Brett served as a financial consultant.

Brett died of pancreatic cancer at his home in Palm Desert, California on April 10, 1989.

References

Directors of the United States Mint
1893 births
1989 deaths
Eisenhower administration personnel